The Duchy of Brzeg or Duchy of Brieg was one of the Duchies of Silesia, created in 1311 during the fragmentation of the Duchy of Wrocław. A Bohemian fief from 1329, it was ruled by the Silesian Piasts until their extinction in 1675. Its capital was Brzeg in Lower Silesia.

History
When the Piast duke Henry V of Wrocław and Legnica died in 1296, his sons and heirs were still minors and his estates were ruled by their uncle Duke Bolko I the Strict of Świdnica, succeeded by their maternal uncle King Wenceslaus II of Bohemia in 1301 and by the Wrocław bishop Henry of Wierzbno in 1305. Finally in 1311, Henry's bequests were divided among his sons: Bolesław III the Generous, the eldest brother, received the southeastern lands around Brzeg and Grodków.

Soon after however, Bolesław insisted on his rights as the firstborn son and ousted his younger brother Władysław from the Duchy of Legnica. He maintained good relations with his brother-in-law, the Luxembourg king John of Bohemia, and declared himself a Bohemian vassal in 1329.

The duchy was re-united with the Duchy of Legnica in 1419, then fragmented again, and united once more with Legnica under Duke Christian in 1664. When the Kingdom of Bohemia was inherited by the Habsburg dynasty of Austria in 1526, the duchy fell under their overlordship as Bohemian kings, although it was still ruled as a lien by the Silesian Piasts.

Together with Legnica and Wołów, Brzeg was the last autonomous duchy of Silesia. Following the death of the last Piast duke George William in 1675, it was administered directly by the House of Habsburg in dynasty's capacity as Kings of Bohemia.

Prussian inheritance claims
However, Brandenburg-Prussia also claimed the duchy, referring to the old inheritance treaty of 1537: in that year Duke Frederick II concluded a treaty with Elector Joachim II Hector of Brandenburg, whereby the Hohenzollern dynasty would inherit the duchy upon the extinction of the Silesian Piasts. Nevertheless, this agreement was rejected by the Bohemian king Ferdinand I of Habsburg and did not come into effect.

In 1675 the Habsburg monarchy again refused to acknowledge the validity of Piast-Hohenzollern agreement and annexed the duchies. Several decades later King Frederick II of Prussia used the dispute as a pretext to justify his campaign during the First Silesian War in 1740 which finally ended by Prussian annexation of almost nine-tenths of whole Silesia.

See also
Dukes of Silesia

References

 ŽÁČEK, Rudolf. Dějiny Slezska v datech. Praha,  Libri, 2003. 

1675 disestablishments
States and territories established in 1311
Duchies of Silesia
Brzeg County